Łukasz Moneta (born 13 May 1994) is a Polish professional footballer who plays as a left midfielder for Ruch Chorzów.

Club career
He made his league debut on 2 August 2014 in an Ekstraklasa match against Górnik Zabrze.

Career statistics

Club

1 Including Polish SuperCup.

Honours
Legia Warsaw
Polish Cup: 2017–18

References

External links

1994 births
Living people
People from Racibórz
Sportspeople from Silesian Voivodeship
Association football midfielders
Polish footballers
Poland under-21 international footballers
Legia Warsaw II players
Legia Warsaw players
Wigry Suwałki players
Ruch Chorzów players
Zagłębie Lubin players
Bytovia Bytów players
GKS Tychy players
OKS Stomil Olsztyn players
Ekstraklasa players
I liga players
III liga players